The 2017 PSA Annual Awards was an awarding ceremony, recognizing the sports athletes, personalities, organizations and NSAs for the year 2016. It is organized by the Philippine Sportswriters Association, the Philippines' oldest media organization founded in 1949, with members composed by sports section editors, sportswriters and sports columnists from major national broadsheets, tabloids and online sports news portals. PSA is currently headed by Riera Mallari, sports editor of the Manila Standard.

The awards night took place at the Le Pavillon, Pasay on February 13, 2017 at 7:30 p.m. (UTC +08). The awards night was hosted by veteran sports broadcaster Quinito Henson and Sports5 head Patricia Bermudez-Hizon with Carla Lizardo and Steph Ongkiko as the co-hosts. Philippine Sports Commission Chairman William "Butch" Ramirez and Philippine Olympic Committee President Jose "Peping" Cojuangco, Jr. and other top sports officials were invited to the event.

2016 Summer Olympics silver medalist Hidilyn Diaz of Weightlifting has named as the PSA Athlete of the Year. She was unanimously chosen by the members of the PSA and beat two other names in the organization's shortlist for the coveted award, Janelle Mae Frayna of Chess and Sen. Manny Pacquiao of boxing. Diaz, who is first Female athlete to win the Athlete of the Year award since 2012 will lead the 91 awardees of the event.

Honor roll

Main awards
The following are the list of main awards of the event.

Major awardees
These are the major awardees of the event. Sorted in alphabetical order.

Citations

Milo Junior Athletes of the Year

Tony Siddayao Awards for Under-17 athletes
The awards was given to young and exceptional athletes aged 17 and below, and was named after Siddayao, the former sports section editor of Manila Standard in the 1980s.

Posthumous awards
The award were given to Philippine sports personalities who passed away in 2016. They will give a trophy and a one-minute of silence for all honorees.

Emy Arcilla (PBA television coverage analyst)
Gilbert Bulawan (Blackwater Elite basketball player)
Benjie Castro (Sports Radio 918 broadcaster and voice-over talent)
Filomeno Codiñera (Filipino baseball and softball player; 2016 PSA lifetime achievement awardee)
Virgilio "Baby" Dalupan (Filipino basketball head coach; known as "The Maestro")
Cecil Hechanova (Philippine Sports Commission chairman, 1990-1992)
Carlos "Caloy" Loyzaga (Philippines' national men's basketball team player; two-time Olympian)
Rogie Maglinas (UP Fighting Maroons football player)
Jonas Mariano (former La Salle basketball player)
Ronnie Nathanielsz (veteran sports broadcaster and columnist)
Mariano "Tom" Ong (Filipino sports shooter; two time Olympian)
Hermie Rivera (Boxing analyst and manager)

See also
2016 in Philippine sports

References

PSA
PSA